The 2007 women's road cycling season was the eighth season for the  Vrienden van het Platteland (UCI code: VVP) cycling team, which began as Ondernemers van Nature in 2000.

The main victories on the road for the team were the time trial at the Tour of Chongming Island by Ellen van Dijk and the Norwegian and Dutch Time Trial Championships by Anita Valen and Ellen van Dijk. On the track Van Dijk also won the individual pursuit at the Dutch National Track Cycling Championships. At the end of the year the team ended 23rd in the UCI Team's Ranking with Ellen van Dijk as the best individual at the 37th place in the UCI Individual Women's Road Ranking.

Roster

Ages as of 1 January 2007.

Sources

Riders who joined the team for the 2007 season

Riders who left the team during or after the 2006 season

Season 
The first podium place for the team was a third place for Jaccolien Wallaard at Omloop Het Volk in March. In May Ellen van Dijk finished third at Omloop van Borsele and in the time trial stage at the Tour de l'Aude Cycliste Féminin. Van Dijk finished third again in an international time trial at the Tour of Chongming Island Time trial in June. The day afterwards Van Dijk won the first stage of the Tour of Chongming Island with Wallaard in third place. After finishing second in the stage 2 and stage 3 Van Dijk ended also second in the general classification. In July Ellen van Dijk represented the Netherlands at the European Championships (under-23) and finished fifth in the time trial. At the national championships Anita Valen won the time trial in Norway and finished second in the road race. In the Netherlands Ellen van Dijk won the Dutch time trial championships. Due to Van Dijks' good results in the time trials she was chosen to represent the Netherlands in the time trial at the World Championships in Stuttgart where she finished 17th. Due to her good results Ellen van Dijk became sportswomen of the year of Woerden. Van Dijk was invited to join the Dutch national track cycling team. At the national track championships she became Dutch champion in the individual pursuit, ahead of Marianne Vos and Kirsten Wild, and finished fourth in the scratch race and points race.

Results

Season victories

Results in major races

UCI World Ranking

The team finished 23rd in the UCI ranking for teams.

References

2007 UCI Women's Teams seasons
2007 in Dutch sport
Vrienden van het Platteland